Alexios Alexopoulos (born 21 May 1971) is a retired Greek sprinter who specialized in the 200 metres.

He won the silver medal at the 1996 European Indoor Championships. He also competed at the 2000 Olympic Games and the World Championships in 1995, 1997 and 1999 without reaching the final. He also competed in the 1999 World Indoor Championships in Maebashi, Japan where he just missed the final.

His personal best time was 20.36 seconds, achieved in June 1999 in Paris. This ranks him fifth among Greek 200 metres sprinters, behind Konstantinos Kenteris, Anastasios Gousis, Thomas Sbokos & Lykourgos-Stefanos Tsakonas.

In the 100 metres his personal best time is 10.16 seconds, achieved in June 1998 in Athens. This ranks him seventh among Greek 100 metres sprinters.
He still holds the National record for 200 metres indoor (since 1996) with 20.62 seconds. He also jointly holds the national record for the 4 × 100 metres relay.

Honours

References 
 

1971 births
Living people
Greek male sprinters
Athletes (track and field) at the 1996 Summer Olympics
Athletes (track and field) at the 2000 Summer Olympics
Olympic athletes of Greece
Athletes from Athens
Mediterranean Games silver medalists for Greece
Mediterranean Games medalists in athletics
Athletes (track and field) at the 1993 Mediterranean Games
20th-century Greek people